is an athletic stadium in Shimonoseki, Yamaguchi Prefecture, Japan.

It is one of the home stadium of football club Renofa Yamaguchi FC.

References

External links
Official site

Sports venues in Yamaguchi Prefecture
Football venues in Japan
Athletics (track and field) venues in Japan
Shimonoseki
Multi-purpose stadiums in Japan
Renofa Yamaguchi FC